The 2005 Monmouth Hawks football team represented Monmouth University in the 2005 NCAA Division I FCS football season as a member of the Northeast Conference (NEC). The Hawks were led by 13th-year head coach Kevin Callahan and played their home games at Kessler Field. They finished the season 6–4 overall and 4–3 in NEC play to tie for second place.

Schedule

References

Monmouth
Monmouth Hawks football seasons
Monmouth Hawks football